The year 2006 is the fourth year in the history of Jungle Fight, a mixed martial arts promotion based in Brazil. In 2006 Jungle Fight held 2 events beginning with, Jungle Fight 6.

Events list

Jungle Fight 6

Jungle Fight 6 was an event held on April 29, 2006 at The Tropical Hotel in Manaus, Amazonas, Brazil.

Results

Jungle Fight Europe

Jungle Fight Europe was an event held on December 17, 2006 at Dvorana Tivoli in Ljubljana, Slovenia.

Results

References

2006 in mixed martial arts
Jungle Fight events
Sport in Manaus